"You Are My Everything" is a song by Surface, released as a single in 1989. It was their third number one on the R&B singles chart in the U.S., as well as their third number one for the 1989 calendar year.  The song charted on the Billboard Hot 100, peaking at number eighty-four.

References

1989 singles
Surface (band) songs
1989 songs
Song articles with missing songwriters
Songs written by David Conley (musician)